Rachel Chinouriri (born 1 November 1998) is an English singer-songwriter. After posting numerous songs on SoundCloud, she began releasing music on major streaming platforms in 2018. She released her debut extended play (EP), Mama's Boy, in 2019 to critical acclaim. One of the songs from the EP, "So My Darling", received attention on TikTok when it became a popular audio to use. Chinouriri was signed to Parlophone, with whom she released her debut mini-album, Four° In Winter, in 2021. She then released her second EP, Better Off Without, in 2022.

Early life and education
Chinouriri was born in Kingston Hospital on 1 November 1998. Her family later moved to Croydon,  where she was raised from age 3. Her family had moved to UK from Zimbabwe shortly prior to her birth, and she experienced a "traditional African upbringing". Her upbringing led her to be curious about British culture, specifically its music, and as a teenager, she became influenced by the discographies of Daughter and Lily Allen. At age 17, she began writing songs and recorded them on a £20 microphone, uploading them to the music sharing website SoundCloud via her mother's laptop.

Career
Chinouriri began formally releasing various singles on major streaming platforms in 2018 which led to her being signed to Parlophone. Her first release with the label was "So My Darling", which she wrote aged 17 and released in 2018. The song received radio play when it was picked as a special play on BBC Radio 1. She was then announced as an act at Field Day festival in 2019. Chinouriri followed "So My Darling" up with "Adrenaline" in April 2019. She played a headline show in London in June 2019.

Chinouriri released her debut extended play (EP), Mama's Boy, in August 2019. It was released to critical acclaim. Following the release, she dropped the song "Where Do I Go?", which she said was written about her thoughts on the afterlife.  The song "Beautiful Disaster", featuring Sam Dotia, was then released in July 2020. Tom Bibby of Yuck magazine described the song as "an honest and heartfelt portrayal of the isolation and stillness felt in the midnight hours, told through Chinouriri's powerful falsettos", adding that she has proved herself to be "a powerful singer-songwriter". She then released various singles, including "Give Me a Reason", "Darker Place" and "Through the Eye". The latter acted as the lead single for her debut mini-album, Four° In Winter, which was released in September 2021. She released a deluxe edition later that year, with the addition of three new songs. In January 2022, after the rise in popularity of her 2018 single "So My Darling" on the video sharing app TikTok, Chinouriri re-released the song in acoustic form. At the time of release, the audio had over 40,000 videos shared on TikTok. Then in March of that year, she released the single "All I Ever Asked". The song was chosen as that week's "Hottest Record in the World" by BBC Radio 1's Clara Amfo. Chinouriri subsequently announced plans for a second EP that would feature the song, as well as a national tour throughout the UK.

Discography

Mini-albums

Extended plays

Singles

As lead artist

As featured artist

References

External links
 
 Rachel Chinouriri on Marathon Artists

1998 births

Living people
21st-century Black British women singers
English women singer-songwriters
English people of Zimbabwean descent
People from Croydon
Parlophone artists
Singers from London